Horkstow Bridge is a suspension bridge that spans the New River Ancholme near the village of Horkstow in North Lincolnshire. It was designed by Sir John Rennie as part of the River Ancholme Drainage Scheme, completed in 1836, and is a Grade II* listed building.

History and description

The River Ancholme rises south of Bishopbridge in Lincolnshire, flows northwards through the town of Brigg and the Ancholme Level, an area of fenland, and enters the Humber at Ferriby Sluice. Attempts were made to drain the wetland and improve the navigability of the river as early as the 13th century, and in the 1630s Sir John Monson constructed the first sluice gates near South Ferriby and a new straight channel, the Ancholme Navigation, to drain the Level and protect the town of Brigg from flooding. A 1767 Act of Parliament authorised works towards "the more effectual draining the Lands lying in the Level of Ancholme" and making the river navigable as high as Bishopbridge, to be financed by a land tax and the imposition of tolls on goods carried. Two further Acts followed to enlarge the powers of the first. Under the 1825 Act, Sir John Rennie proposed the New River Ancholme Drainage Scheme, by which the navigation, or New River Ancholme, was straightened, widened and deepened, existing small bridges with many arches were replaced by single-span structures, and the locks at Ferriby Sluice were enlarged.

Horkstow Bridge, the only suspension bridge designed by Rennie, is one of several bridges built as part of that project. The ironwork was supplied by Messrs John and Edward Walker of Gospel Oak Ironworks, Tipton, Staffordshire, and the bridge was completed in 1836 under the supervision of site engineer Adam Smith. At each end of the bridge are rusticated stone piers in the form of  towers which form archways above the road. At normal water levels there is  clearance beneath the bridge.

A ferry had previously connected the villages, and it is believed a bridge had occupied the site from the 18th century, providing access to the brick-making kilns located on the Winterton side. The bridge is open to vehicles, but movement can be felt even under pedestrian traffic. It can be approached from the east via Bridge Lane, a narrow road which leaves the B1204 just north of Horkstow, but on the west bank only a dirt track remains.

Horkstow is one of "only a handful" of early suspension bridges in Britain to remain as originally designed, but it has not survived completely unscathed. In 1979, repairs were needed after the tractor unit of a 23-ton articulated lorry fell through into the river, destroying a quarter of the bridge deck and damaging the attached suspension rods, though the rest of the structure remained intact. In the 1990s, the bridge was strengthened – the deck relaid using a tropical hardwood timber to support a 5 t load and the underground parts of the suspension chains replaced with high-tensile bars – while retaining its appearance and functionality. The works earned engineers C Spencer Ltd a commendation in the 1999 Institution of Civil Engineers Historic Bridge Awards.

Although open to motor traffic, it is mostly used by ramblers, cyclists and anglers. It is owned by the Environment Agency, and in September 1979 was listed at Grade II*, a grading which covers "particularly important buildings of more than special interest". The site of the former brickyard is a Site of Nature Conservation Interest.

References

Gallery

Suspension bridges
Bridges in Lincolnshire
Bridges completed in 1836
Grade II* listed buildings in North Lincolnshire
Grade II* listed bridges in England